Faunus ater is a species of brackish water snail with an operculum, an aquatic gastropod mollusk in the family Pachychilidae.

Faunus ater is the only species within the genus Faunus.

Distribution 
The distribution of Faunus ater includes:
 India
 Sri Lanka
 Andaman Islands
 Malaysia
 Myanmar
 Thailand
 Singapore
 Indonesia
 Philippines
 New Guinea
 western and southern Pacific Islands: Solomon Islands
 northern Australia
 China

Description 
The periostracum is thick, and the color of the periostracum is dark brown or black. The shell has about 20 whorls. The apical whorls may be eroded in older snails. The aperture is ovate and white. The shell is unique among Cerithioidea, because it has two deep sinuses: an anal sinus which is close to the suture and an anterior sinus more forward in the aperture. The height of the aperture is about one-fifth of the height of the shell.

The height of the shell is usually 50–60 mm, but can be up to 90 mm.

The operculum is oval, corneous and dark brown in color.
 
The snail has a broad snout. The radula is large and is located in a correspondingly large buccal mass.

Ecology 
This snail lives in slightly brackish water. It has also been reported from freshwater. It is the only pachychilid species that lives in brackish water; the other species in the family are freshwater snails.

The population density can reach up to 6700 snails per m2.

This snail probably feeds by grazing.

It is oviparous. It probably has free-swimming larvae.

Human use 
This snail is used as a food source for humans in the Philippines and in Thailand.

References

Further reading 
 Gray J. E. (1867). "On the species of the genera Latiaxis, Faunus and Melanatria". American Journal of Conchology 3: 330.
 Houbrick R. S. (1991). "Anatomy and systematic placement of Faunus Montfort 1810 (Prosobranchia: Melanopsinae)". Malacological Review 24: 35-54.
 Yap C. K., Hisyam M. N. D., Edward F. B., Cheng W. H. & Tan S. G. (2010). "Concentrations of heavy metal in different parts of the gastropod, Faunus ater (Linnaeus), collected from intertidal areas of Peninsular Malaysia". Pertanika Journal of Tropical Agricultural Science 33(1): 45-60.

External links 

Pachychilidae